Gala Porras-Kim (born 1984, Bogota, Colombia) is a contemporary  interdisciplinary artist who lives and works in Los Angeles. Her work has been shown at the Whitney, LACMA, and the Hammer Museum. Much of her work deals with time, and the way the perception of objects changes over time. In March 2022, Porras-Kim was featured on the cover of Artforum for her work at Amant in New York.

Career 
In 2017 she was the recipient of an Artadia Award, and in 2015 of Creative Capital and Tiffany Foundation awards. She is participated in the 2019 Whitney Biennial. Porras-Kim also curated a show at the Museum of Contemporary Art, Los Angeles in October 2019.  As a scholar at the Peabody Museum of Archaeology and Ethnology at Harvard University, Porras-Kim researched objects from archeological sites in Mexico. Her work as artist-in-residence at the Getty Center investigates "social and political contexts that influence how language and history intersect with art." In March 2022, Porras-Kim was featured on the cover of Artforum for her work at Amant in New York.

Work 
Gala uses a social and political context that influences the representation of language and history to create art objects through the learning process.

References

Living people
1984 births
21st-century Colombian women artists
21st-century sculptors
American artists of Korean descent
Colombian expatriates in the United States
University of California, Los Angeles alumni
People from Bogotá
Colombian American
American people of Colombian descent